Dirty Mary, Crazy Larry is a 1974 American road crime drama film based on the 1963 Richard Unekis novel titled The Chase (later retitled Pursuit). Directed by John Hough, the film stars Peter Fonda, Susan George, Adam Roarke, and Vic Morrow. Although Jimmie Haskell is credited with writing the music score, the soundtrack contains no incidental music apart from the theme song "Time (Is Such a Funny Thing)", sung by Marjorie McCoy, over the opening and closing titles, and a small amount of music heard over the radio.

Plot
Two NASCAR hopefuls, driver Larry Rayder and his mechanic Deke Sommers, successfully execute a supermarket heist to finance their jump into big-time auto racing. They extort $150,000 in cash from a supermarket manager by holding his wife and daughter hostage.

In making their escape, they are confronted by Larry's one-night stand, Mary Coombs. She coerces them to take her along for the ride in their souped-up 1966 Chevrolet Impala. The unorthodox sheriff, Captain Everett Franklin, obsessively pursues the trio in a dragnet, only to find his outmoded patrol cars unable to catch Larry, Mary, and Deke after they ditch the Impala for a 1969 Dodge Charger R/T 440 at a flea market.

As part of the escape plan, Larry's vehicle enters an expansive grid of walnut groves, where the trees provide significant cover from aerial tracking, and the many intersecting roads ("with sixty distinct and separate exits") make road blocks ineffective. The trio evades several Dodge Polara patrol cars, one of them a specially prepared high-performance police interceptor that effectively keeps up with the Charger, and even Captain Franklin himself in a Bell JetRanger helicopter. Believing they've finally beaten the police, Larry and company meet their doom when they collide with a freight train pulled by an Alco S-1 locomotive, which unexpectedly emerges from a walnut grove.

Cast
 Peter Fonda as Larry Rayder
 Susan George as Mary Coombs
 Adam Roarke as Deke Sommers
 Vic Morrow as Capt. Everett Franklin
 Kenneth Tobey as Sheriff Carl Donahue
 Lynn Borden as Evelyn Stanton
 Adrianne Herman as Cindy Stanton
 James W. Gavin as Helicopter Pilot
 Roddy McDowall as George Stanton

Original novel
Dirty Mary, Crazy Larry is based on the novel originally titled The Chase (later renamed Pursuit) by Richard Unekis, published in 1963. It was Unekis' debut novel. The New York Times called it "a brilliantly detailed and breathless tale of pursuit".

The story incorporated a phenomenon that was relatively new in 1963:  major auto manufacturers were putting powerful V-8 engines into mid-sized cars (the dawn of the "muscle car" era) and young thieves behind the wheel of these cars were now able to outrun the economy 6-cylinder sedans driven by police in many jurisdictions. The protagonists of The Chase used such a vehicle, a Chevrolet, and made use of the checkerboard of roads in the farm country of Illinois to outrun the police, as well as the cover of an approaching thunderstorm. The end of the novel closely matches the film, only with a tanker truck involved.

Production

Filming
The film was shot in late 1973 in and around Stockton, California, mostly in the walnut groves near the small town of Linden, California. The railroad track in the final scene of the film served the Diamond Food processing plant in Linden and was abandoned in the 1980s when the plant switched to trucks for their transportation. The track still exists, in an abandoned state, and is owned by Omnitrax Corp.

The supermarket scenes were filmed in both Sutter Hill and Sonora, California, the drawbridge jump was filmed in Tracy, California, the swap meet scene in Clements, California, and the climactic train crash was filmed on the Stockton Terminal and Eastern Railroad in Linden, near the intersection of Ketcham Lane and Archerdale Road. The Bell JetRanger helicopter used in the climactic chase was flown by veteran film pilot James W. Gavin (who played the character of the pilot as well) and was actually flown between rows of trees and under powerlines as seen in the film.

In the commentary of the 2005 DVD and later Blu-ray releases, Hough says two blue 1966 Chevrolet Impalas, as well as two 1969 (and one 1968) Citron Yella Dodge Chargers were used in the filming. As the film was a low-budget project, and no more than three Chargers could be purchased, a team of mechanics would work on the cars overnight to repair damage, while the film crew would cycle through the available cars throughout the shooting day. Car haulers would follow the filming team with the additional cars as they were available.

In the same interview, Hough revealed that the ending in which the Charger crashes into the train was not in the original script. The novel upon which the film was based ended with the robbers colliding with a tanker truck, but the Linden filming location offered a maze of railroad crossings, the ending was changed to incorporate the collision with the locomotive.

Hough said the lead characters did not die in the script: "I did that myself without asking or telling anybody. Consequently, we would not be able to make a sequel because the leading characters were all killed. But a statement I really wanted to make, was: speed kills. If you're gonna drive a hundred miles an hour, you’ll get yourself killed, so you'd better not speed."

Fonda said the film was shot "pretty much in sequence. We had about 20 exciting stunts and about five minutes worth of acting. We had to make our scenes count. Adam Roarke, Susan George, and myself were sort of like The Three Stooges I guess you could say...I had a fine time making the film. It was a lot of fun.”

Post-production
The film developers thought that the Dodge Charger was actually bright yellow so they "corrected" the film negatives to eliminate the greenish tint of the car. Therefore, the entire movie in theaters, on TV, and on VHS was originally very warm toned. The color was more correct in the 2005 DVD release (and later Blu-ray releases) and the Dodge Charger became the correct lime green color.

Release

Box office
Dirty Mary, Crazy Larry was released by Fox in the spring of 1974 and was a surprise hit earning North American rentals of $12.1 million, making it Fox's most successful film of the year. By 1977, it earned an estimated $14.7 million in theatrical rentals.

Fonda said the film "made a shit pile of money. More money than any film Dennis [Hopper] ever made." He added, "I couldn't believe that so many moviegoers had seen the film four or five times. I could understand them seeing Easy Rider four or five times or maybe even The Hired Hand, but why Dirty Mary, Crazy Larry? Heck, I was even embarrassed by the title."

Nonetheless the film established Fonda as a draw on the exploitation circuit and most of his films over the next few years were action movies.

On February 18, 1977, the film came to broadcast television (with several scenes cut before the theatrical release reinserted to extend the film's length to the minimum required to fill a standard two-hour time slot).   These added-for-TV scenes have never been released to home video.

Critical reception
The film received mixed reviews from critics.  

Edgar Wright said the film influenced Baby Driver. He said he "always felt sorry for the actor Adam Roarke in it who plays Deke. He's in the movie for the entire thing. You assume in the movie that Adam Roarke is going to die at some point, but he's there right to the end, so it really should be called Dirty Mary, Crazy Larry and Deke. Why does this guy get left off the title? He's been there the whole time."

Home media
The film was released on VHS and Beta in October 1979 on Magnetic Video.

On June 28, 2005, the film was released on DVD through Anchor Bay Entertainment as a "Supercharger Edition". It included a color-corrected and fully restored theatrical version of the film as well as many bonus features.

On April 12, 2011, the restored film was released again on DVD, this time through Shout! Factory, packaged as a double feature with another Peter Fonda film Race with the Devil. This release contained fewer bonus features than the Anchor Bay release.

This same release debuted on Blu-ray for the first time on June 4, 2013.

See also
 List of American films of 1974

References

Notes

External links
 
 
 
 

1974 films
1970s English-language films
1970s chase films
1970s heist films
1970s road movies
American chase films
American heist films
American road movies
Films about automobiles
Films based on American novels
Films based on crime novels
Films directed by John Hough
Films scored by Jimmie Haskell
Films set in California
Films shot in California
Rail transport films
20th Century Fox films
1970s American films